Håvard Solbakken (born August 9, 1973) is a retired Norwegian cross-country skier who competed in the FIS Cross-Country World Cup between 1997 and 2006. He won a bronze medal in the individual sprint at the 2001 FIS Nordic World Ski Championships in Lahti.

Cross-country skiing results
All results are sourced from the International Ski Federation (FIS).

World Championships
 1 medal – (1 bronze)

World Cup

Season standings

Individual podiums
 4 podiums

Team podiums

 1 podium – (1 )

References

External links

Norwegian male cross-country skiers
1973 births
Living people
FIS Nordic World Ski Championships medalists in cross-country skiing